The Callous Daoboys are an American mathcore band from Atlanta, Georgia. Their name is a play on words, based on the Dallas Cowboys football team.

History

My Dixie Wrecked and Animal Tetris (2016–2017) 
The Callous Daoboys released their debut EP, titled My Dixie Wrecked, on April 1, 2017. On December 1 of that same year, the band released their second EP, Animal Tetris. This was the last release to contain the band's original lineup.

Die on Mars (2018–2022) 
In early 2018, drummer Alex Jerral and bassist Claire Darling left the band; Sam Williamson joined as the band's new drummer, and Jackie Buckalew as the bassist. On June 21, 2019, the band released their debut studio album, Die on Mars, under Dark Trail Records. Reception to the album was very positive, and gained a lot of attention for the band. Caleb Newton of Captured Howls described the album as "...an immersive experience that's far out ahead of... any kind of conventional songwriting."

MNRK Music Group and Celebrity Therapist (2022–present) 
On March 19, 2022, The Callous Daoboys released a single titled "A Brief Article Regarding Time Loops", and announced that they were signing to MNRK Music Group for the release of an upcoming second studio album. Their second album, Celebrity Therapist, was released on September 2, 2022.

Musical style 
The band have been described as mathcore, and have referred to themselves as a nu-metal band, citing The Dillinger Escape Plan, Botch, Korn, Slipknot, and Linkin Park as their biggest influences.

Members

Current members 

 Carson Pace – vocals (2016–present)
 Daniel Hodsdon – guitar (2022–present)
 Maddie Caffrey – guitar (2016–present)
 Jackie Buckalew – bass guitar, vocals (2018–present)
 Amber Christman – violin (2016–present)
 Abby Sherman – synthesizer, vocals (2021-present)
 Rich Castillo – saxophone (2022–present)
 Matthew Ryan – drums (2022–present)

Past members 

 Alex Jerral – drums (2016-2018)
 Claire Darling – bass guitar (2016–2018)
 Adam Collins – guitar (2016–2022)
 Sam Williamson – drums (2018–2022)
 Whitney Jordan – synthesizer, vocals (2019-2021)

Discography

Studio Albums 
 Die on Mars (2019)
 Celebrity Therapist (2022)

EPs 

 My Dixie Wrecked (2017)
 Animal Tetris (2017)

References 

Musical groups established in 2017
American mathcore musical groups
MNRK Music Group artists